Wendell Lee Minckley (November 13, 1935 – June 22, 2001) was a college professor and leading expert on fish. He spent most of his career at Arizona State University. In 1963, he with Robert Rush Miller discovered and named the northern platyfish (Xiphophorus gordoni) in honor of Dr. Myron Gordon. Dr. Minckley, in turn, had five species named in his honor. Dr. Minckley died on June 22, 2001 in Desert Samaritan Hospital in Mesa, Arizona, from complications associated with treatment for cancer.

Legacy
The freshwater snail genus Minckleyella Hershler, Liu & Landye, 2011 is named in honor of him.

Minckley's cichlid  Herichthys minckleyi is named after him.

See also
:Category:Taxa named by Wendell L. Minckley

References

Xiphophorus gordoni, a New Species ... Copeia Sept 25 1963

External links
 
 

American ichthyologists
1935 births
2001 deaths
Arizona State University faculty
20th-century American zoologists